Chamchamal District is a district of the Sulaymaniyah Governorate in the Kurdistan Region of Iraq.

References 

Geography of Iraqi Kurdistan
Districts of Sulaymaniyah Province